Weidmannsche Buchhandlung is a German book publisher established in 1680 that remained independent until it was acquired by Verlag Georg Olms in 1983.

History

Weidmannsche Buchhandlung was established in 1680 in Frankfurt by  Moritz Georg Weidmann (1658-1693), who moved to Leipzig in 1681.
Johann Ludwig Gleditsch, brother of Johann Friedrich Gleditsch, married Weidmann's widow in 1694 and built up the business of the house, while training the younger Moritz Georg Weidmann (1686 - 1743) to take over the business.
Gleditsch published authors such as Wieland, Gellert, Lessing, Lavater and Heyne.
The most significant achievement of the Gleditsch brothers was to persuade the leading Dutch booksellers to send their works to the Leipzig fair instead of to Frankfurt.

Weidmannsche Buchhandlung continued to publish in Leipzig until 1854, reaching its height under Philipp Erasmus Reich, called the "nation's bookseller". 
The firm moved to Berlin in 1854, and continued publishing in Berlin, Dublin and Zurich under the Reimer publishing family.
In 1983 the firm was taken over by Verlag Georg Olms. Books printed in Berlin bore the Latin imprimatur "apud Weidmannos, Berolini".

Leadership
The publishing house was led by:
 Moritz Georg Weidmann (1658-1693) (1680-1693)
 Johann Ludwig Gleditsch (1694-1717)
 Moritz Georg Weidmann (1686 - 1743) (1713/1717-1743)
 Philipp Erasmus Reich (1746-1787)
 Georg Andreas Reimer (1822 -1832)
 Karl Reimer and Salomon Hirzel (1830-1852/1858)
 Hans Reimer d. Ä. (1865-1887)
 Paul Parey und Ernst Vollert (1888-1928)
 Hans Reimer d.J. (1913-1951)
 Walter Georg Olms (1983-)

Published writers
The publisher has published writings of: 
 Ernst Moritz Arndt
 Adelbert von Chamisso
 Christian Fürchtegott Gellert
 Johann Kaspar Lavater
 Johann Gottfried Herder
 Alexander von Humboldt
 Christoph Martin Wieland
 Jean Paul
 August Wilhelm
 Friedrich Schlegel
 Brothers Grimm
 Adolf Kaegi
 Ulrich von Wilamowitz-Moellendorff 
 Heinrich Friedrich Karl Freiherr vom Stein 
 Theodore Mommsen

References

Further reading
 Buchner, Karl: Wieland und die Weidmannsche Buchhandlung: Zur Geschichte deutscher Literatur und   deutschen Buchhandels. Berlin: Weidmann 1871.
 Kurtze, Gerhard: Philipp Erasmus Reich. Erster Buchhändler der Nation. In: Die großen Leipziger:  26 Annäherungen. Vera Hauschild (Hrsg.). Frankfurt/Main & Leipzig: Insel Verlag 1996. pp. 144–154.
 Lehmstedt, Mark: Philipp Erasmus Reich (1717-1787). Verleger der Aufklärung und Reformer des deutschen Buchhandels. (Ausstellungskatalog). Leipzig: Karl-Marx-Universität 1989.
 Jauernig, Erich (eds.): 250 Jahre Weidmannsche Buchhandlung. In: Monatsschrift für Höhere Schulen. Beilage/ Heft 4. Berlin: 1930.

Book publishing companies of Germany
1680 establishments in the Holy Roman Empire
Companies based in Leipzig